Roads in Ukraine is a network of automobile roads that includes various types of roadways. The roads are usually categorized into general (public) use including streets and roads within populated areas (i.e. cities/villages), and other including official, private, and special use. The general use roadways are the main traveling routes and some better are part of the E-road network. High-speed highways (motorways), however, locally known as avtomahistrali or expressways (shvydkisni dorohy) are rare and only available on selected segments of major routes. Big construction projects to improve the national road infrastructure was announced in early 2010 in preparation to the Euro 2012 football competition and there was established Ministry of Infrastructure of Ukraine headed by Borys Kolesnikov. The reality turned to be more prosaic and the road infrastructure continues to be among main problems in the country.

Ukraine's network of roadways was inherited from the Ukrainian SSR (Soviet Ukraine), and during the Soviet period it was part of the bigger Soviet network of roadways. The modern network consists 99% of roads for public use with 12% assigned as of state importance and 87% - local importance. The existing road network was mostly built (established) sometime in the 1960s and 1970s. For comparison, in 1940 the highway network of Ukraine consisted of 270,700 kilometers of which only 10.8% contained a paved surface.

Some critics point out that not only road conditions, but road safety is in complete disarray and the level of police corruption has not diminished after the recent reforms.

Since 2020, the big construction project named "Great Construction" is in full flow and since then, many roads have been reconstructed or renovated.

Overview

After the fall of the Soviet Union all road service state bodies within Ukraine were reorganized. The state agency Ukravtodor was established as a state corporation in 1990, replacing the Ministry of Roadways of Soviet Ukraine as the state governing body of automobile roads in modern Ukraine. It is supplemented by a project institute Ukrhiprodor which designs objects of road management. Ukravtodor is supervised by the Ministry of Infrastructure of Ukraine. On February 28, 2002 by the Presidential order the state owned open stock company Avtomobilni dorohy Ukrainy (ADU) was created. The company was directly involved in road construction and maintenance. In 2016 ADU was merged into Ukravtodor, with the latter now owning 100% of its shares.

In 2015 the World Bank Group approved a US$560 million loan to improve road conditions in Ukraine particularly along the M03 route between Poltava and Kharkiv among others.

In 2016 many of Ukraine's major provincial highways were in very poor condition, with 97% of roads in need of repair at that time, according to Ukravtodor. This high figure was mostly a result of budget misallocations due to corruption, and lackluster weight restriction enforcement for trucks. In 2016 the road repair budget was set at about ₴20 billion. In 2017 the Groysman government began a three year large-scale renovation of Ukraine's motorway infrastructure, with the road budget climbing to ₴42 billion in 2018. In 2019, the annual road budget rose further to ₴51 billion, and reached a record high of ₴70 billion in 2020.

Ukraine's increased efforts at road maintenance and construction are showing tangible results. On the Quality of Roads Report of the World Economic Forum, Ukraine rose from 139th place in 2014 to 119th place in 2019, improving 20 places in five years.

Classifications

The state importance roads have three indexes M, H, P, T, each stand for the respective letter of Cyrillic. The state importance roads are utilized by the European E-network of highways.

The M-network of roads ( - International) along with H-network ( - National) range from 01 to 33 and consist of two digits. These roads are designed for the major transportation corridors across the country and the European highway system.

The P-network of roads ( - Regional) ranges from 01 to 84 and also is a combination of two digits.

The T-network ( - Territorial) of roads are part of territorial road network within the main subdivision of Ukraine (i.e. regions of Ukraine) and their index includes a combination of four digits with extra two indices to identify the region where a particular road is located.

Avtomahistral

In Ukraine high-speed a divided highway or motorway is called avtomahistral. Currently they are not designated into a separate network, instead only segments of the M roads are adapted to the standard.

In the late 2000s the first improved highspeed freeways were opened, such as the avtomahistral Kyiv - Boryspil, which forms the segment of the M03 road connecting the capital with the Boryspil International Airport, and the M29 which connects Kharkiv and Dnipro running along the M18 road. An important supplemental feature of the avtomahistral is an electronic informational system that allows the traveling drivers to be informed of any updates on the route. That experimental project was installed in 2007 and cost ₴40 million.

Road characteristics categories
Aside of classification the roads in Ukraine are categorized by the road's ability to handle a certain degree of traffic. There are five categories with roads of I category split in a and b subcategories. Also all roads of I category are considered avtomahistral, however not all of them could be considered as real motorways. Since around 2010 there were two major avtomahistrals: Kyiv - Boryspil and Kharkiv - Dnipro. They are categorized as the top roads of category Ia.

List of International E-road network in Ukraine
The European routes are part of the International E-road network, routes of which run not only throughout the European continent covering such remote areas as the British Isles, but also parts of the Asian continent regions such as Middle Asia, Caucasus mountains, and Asia Minor. The European routes in Ukraine mostly travel on the Ukrainian International routes network, known as M-network.

In the list below with a green background are identified the main routes. Those are either ones that end with zero (0) or five (5). Note that odd numbers have north-south directions and even numbers - east-west. With the red background are the obsolete routes.

Notes: 
 Route  is completely located within Ukraine.

Transportation corridors

The European route network creates several important transport corridors known as Pan-European corridors and also including such as Gdańsk-Odesa, Eurasian, Europe-Asia, BSEC, and others. There is a proposition to create a beltway around the Black Sea, traveling through the Crimean peninsula.

Among the Pan-European corridors system, Ukraine houses such corridors as III (Brussels - Dresden - Kraków - Kyiv), V (Venice - Budapest - Lviv - Kyiv), VII (The Danube river), and IX (Helsinki - Saint-Petersburg - Homiel - Kyiv - Chișinău - Bucharest - Thrace).

Border checkpoints

Projects
 Dnipro - Reshetylivka Highway (N-31)
As of 2020, work is ongoing on the strategic N-31 highway connecting the capital with Dnipro, a major industrial hub. The largest construction site is located in the Poltava region, where a 7-kilometre section of concrete-surface highway is being built from scratch. The bypass section around Poltava includes a 518-metre long viaduct.

 Kyiv - Odesa Highway (M-05)
As of 2020, work is underway to reconstruct the Kyiv-Odessa Highway along its entire length of 453 km. Reconstruction is scheduled to finish in 2021. According to Ukravtodor, the reconstruction is "complex", as it includes not just the road surface, but adjacent road services as well, such as the installation of weight-in-motion (WiM) complexes, grade-separated intersections, and the abandonment of left-turning lanes.

 Zhytomyr Northern Bypass (M-06)
The Northern Bypass section of the M-06 Highway around Zhytomyr is being expanded to four lanes, with the maximum speed increased to 110 km/h. The project includes four multi-level interchanges and three grade-separated railway crossings. Construction is scheduled to finish in 2020.

 Rivne Northern Bypass Phase One
A two-lane bypass road is currently under construction around the city of Rivne. The first phase is a 6 km road section built from scratch, linking the N-25 and T-18-32 highways. The project aims to relieve the city center from heavy transit traffic. The project includes a 280-metre long overpass above a ravine.

Roads of local importance
The local importance roads have three classes as well, but only two indexes T, O. The Raion network of roads does not have a system implemented. The indexes for the local roads are also supplemented by an oblast index where they are located.

Note that the list is arranged in the order of Cyrillic (for some unexplained reasons Chernihiv oblast goes in front of Chernivtsi oblast). For example, the territorial highway 22 in Rivne Oblast would be identified as T-18-22 where 18 is the index for the Rivne Oblast. The T-network (Territorial) as the rest of the roads networks of local importance differs per oblast, but the road numbering itself consists of two digits. The Oblast network (O-network), on the other hand, has the same concept of T-network, but the road numbering contains four digits and the code does not have the hyphen as in T-networks. For example, a highway in Kharkiv Oblast would have code O-21xxxx.

Special routes in Ukraine

There are two main technical terms for special routes: pidyizd (ukr. під'їзд) and obyizd (ukr. об'їзд).
 Pidyizd route is usually an access route that splits from the main route towards an important geographic point such as city, airport, park etc. On the adjacent picture it can be compared to the spur route.
 Obyizd route is a type of ring road which is not necessarily complete. On the adjacent picture it can be compared to the bypass route, business route, truck route.

Historical routes
 Murava Route
 Bila Tserkva road
 Izyum Route (branch of Murava route)
 Silk Road
 Berlad road
 From the Varangians to the Greeks
 Chumak route
 Black route
 Romodanovsky route
 Kuchma route (branch of Black route)
 Kraków road
 Kolky route
 Kyiv route
 Kalmius route (branch of Murava route)
 Zaloha route

Populated area roadways
Types of roadways
 Vulytsia/street, a most common and generic type of a roadway within a populated area with the English counterpart becoming more widely used
 Shose, a broad road built for high-speed traffic for big distances with limited number of points through which drivers can access it; generally accessible road, especially main road that connects cities or settlements
 Prospekt, a term for a broad, long, and straight road in big cities
 Bulvar, a scenic broad road, such as boulevard
 Naberezhna, a roadway along shore or bank of body of water (i.e. sea, river, or lake)
 Obyizdna/kiltseva, a roadway around city
 Provulok, a back street, small roadway such as side street

See also
 State Highways (Ukraine), list of state (national) highways

References

Sources
International Highways in Ukraine (russian, ukrainian, english languages)
 
 Convention of road markings and signals
 Official text of the European agreement on International Highway System (E-Network)
 Declaration of the Cabinets Ministers of Ukrainian SSR of joining the European agreement on E-Network
 Law of Ukraine on automobile roads (highways), Law of Ukraine on road movement, Law of Ukraine on transport, Regulations for the international highways of the Commonwealth of Independent States
 Declaration of Cabinet of Minister of Ukraine on the tollway Lviv-Krakovets, Law of Ukraine on the tollway Kiev-Odessa
 Traffic signs in Ukraine
 List of state automobile roads for general use. Cabinet of Ukraine. January 1, 2013

 
Road infrastructure in Ukraine